Arias with a Twist is a collaborative play created by drag queen Joey Arias and puppeteer Basil Twist. It premiered on June 12, 2008 at the HERE Arts Center in the Dorothy B. Williams Theatre. Although the play is performed as a one-person show starring Arias, it also features the work of six nearly invisible puppeteers who manipulate traditional marionettes, hand puppets, and the scenic elements. It has been nominated for the 2009 Drama Desk Award for Unique Theatrical Experience.

Plot
The play opens with a musical band of four marionettes, each playing an instrument; piano, drums, trumpet, and bass. After a brief song, the audience is introduced to Joey Arias. Arias has been kidnapped by aliens and is subjected to probing while she performs a version of Kashmir by Led Zeppelin. When the aliens are finished with the intrusion, they eject her from their spaceship and she crash lands in a jungle, presumably on earth.  She follows her landing with Jungle of Eden, an original song by the Propellerheads' Alex Gifford. Alone and hungry, Arias searches for food only to find a mushroom that causes her to hallucinate. During the hallucination sequence, psychedelic imagery is projected onto a scrim at the front of the stage while Arias sings a Beatles medley comprising Lucy in the Sky with Diamonds and Within You, Without You. The scene shifts to an undisclosed location where objects float through the air accompanied by Arias's monologue on her sugar daddy. She is then sent to Hell, where she performs a musical number and some suggestive activities with two giant anatomically correct male devil puppets. Arias sings the Eric Carmen song All By Myself and is confronted by her doppelganger in puppet form who inspires her to return to New York City. This prompts another original Alex Gifford song, Lately. When Arias returns to New York, she arrives just in time to perform in a show with the aforementioned puppet band where she sings the Lambert, Hendricks & Ross song, Twisted, the Bill Carey and Carl T. Fischer song, You've Changed, and Ziegfeld Follies song, You've Gotta Pull Strings. The production ends in a Busby Berkeley-esque finalé, which includes mirrors and kaleidoscopic video images of Arias's face.

Original cast
Joey Arias
Oliver Dalzell
Randy Ginsburg
Kirsten Kammermeyer
Matt Leabo
Jessica Scott
Lindsay Abromaitis Smith

Original creative team
Director: Basil Twist
Lighting Designer: Ayumu Saegusa
Sound Designer: Greg Duffin
Projection Designer: Daniel Brodie
Costume Concepts: Thierry Mugler
Costume Designer: Chris March
Musical Arrangements: Eliot Douglass and Jean Houle Francoise
Original Songs: Alex Gifford
Stage Manager: Neelam Vaswani
Producers: Barbara Busackino, Here's Dream Music Puppetry Program, Tandem Otter Productions, and Johnnie Moore

References
NYTheatre.com
Playbill.com

External links
Official website
Airas with a Twist official blog
New York Times review
Time Out New York review
CurtainUp.com review

2008 plays
American plays
Comedy plays
Off-Broadway plays
LGBT-related plays
Plays set in New York City
Plays set in hell
Plays featuring puppetry